The Old Square (Spanish: Plaza Vieja) is a square located in Villarrobledo, Spain. It was declared Bien de Interés Cultural in 1972.

References 

Plazas in Spain
Tourist attractions in Castilla–La Mancha
Bien de Interés Cultural landmarks in the Province of Albacete
Villarrobledo